Palazzi is an Italian surname. Notable people with the surname include:

Abdul Hadi Palazzi (born 1961), Italian imam
Andrea Palazzi (born 1996), Italian footballer
Carlo Palazzi (died 2000), Italian fashion designer
Caterina Palazzi (born 1982), Italian musician
Gaetano Palazzi (1832–1892), Italian painter
Lou Palazzi (1921–2007), American football player
Mattia Palazzi (born 1978), Italian politician
Michele Palazzi (born 1984), Italian photographer
Mirko Palazzi (born 1987), Italian-born Sammarinese footballer
Osvaldo Palazzi, Italian gymnast
Togo Palazzi (born 1932), American basketball player
Giacomo Palazzi (born 2004) 

Italian-language surnames